Geoffrey Tattersall, KC (born 22 September 1947) is a former Judge of Appeal in the Isle of Man.

Biography
Tattersall was born on 22 September 1947 in Ashton-under-Lyne, Lancashire, England. He was educated at Manchester Grammar School from 1958 to 1966. He studied jurisprudence at Christ Church, Oxford and was called to the bar at Lincoln's Inn in 1970.

He was appointed a Queen's Counsel (QC) in 1992. He was the Judge of Appeal for the Isle of Man from 1997 to 2017, and a Deputy High Court Judge in England since 2003. As a barrister, he was a member of the Byrom Street Chambers, Manchester from 1992, and 22 Old Buildings, London. 

Tattersall has been a member of the General Synod of the Church of England since 1995. He has been Diocesan Chancellor of the Diocese of Carlisle since 2003 and of the Diocese of Manchester from 2004. He was the Vicar General of the Diocese of Sodor and Man from 2015 to 2019. He supports the introduction of church blessings for same-sex relationships but not same-sex weddings: "I cannot see how we cannot allow the relationships of those who are LGBTI+ to be blessed in Church although I have doubts as to whether the Church could recognise their relationships as married".

References

External links
Byrom Street Chambers
22 Old Buildings

Living people
Year of birth missing (living people)
Manx judges
20th-century King's Counsel
Members of Lincoln's Inn
Alumni of Christ Church, Oxford
People educated at Manchester Grammar School
Members of the General Synod of the Church of England